This is a list of notable people related to Savitribai Phule Pune University. Excluded from this list are those people whose only connection with Savitribai Phule Pune University is that they were awarded an honorary degree.

Politics and government

Heads of state and government

Note that P.V. Narasimha Rao, 9th Prime Minister of India, graduated from Fergusson College, when the college was under the University of Mumbai.

Others

Business

Military

Science and engineering

Akhil Chandra Banerjea, virologist, N-BIOS laureate
John Barnabas, evolutionary biologist, Shanti Swarup Bhatnagar Prize (1974)
Dipshikha Chakravortty, microbiologist, N-Bios laureate
Shridhar Ramachandra Gadre, chemist and professor at the Indian Institute of Technology Kanpur; recipient of the Shanti Swarup Bhatnagar Prize for Science and Technology in Chemical Science (1993)
Sanjeev Galande, epigeneticist, Shanti Swarup Bhatnagar (2010) laureate
Faisal Hawar, engineer and entrepreneur, CEO/President and co-founder of the International Somalia Development Foundation as well as the Maakhir Resource Company
Yogesh M. Joshi, rheologist, Shanti Swarup Bhatnagar (2015) laureate
Thomas Kailath, electrical engineer, information theorist; recipient of the 2007 IEEE Medal of Honor; recipient of the 2014 National Medal of Science; Hitachi America Professor of Engineering at Stanford University
Nissim Kanekar, astrophysicist, Shanti Swarup Bhatnagar laureate
Vistasp Karbhari, civil engineer, President of the University of Texas at Arlington
Sulabha K Kulkarni, physicist, Visiting Faculty, IISER Pune
Kantilal Mardia, statistician and Guy Medallist, Senior Research Professor at the University of Leeds
Goverdhan Mehta, chemist, recipient of the Shanti Swarup Bhatnagar Prize for Science and Technology in Chemical Science (1978)
Kullal Chickappu Naik, agricultural scientist
Deepak T. Nair, molecular biologist, Shanti Swarup Bhatnagar laureate
Suhas Patankar, mechanical engineer and professor at the University of Minnesota; pioneer in the field of computational fluid dynamics (CFD) and finite volume method
C. Kumar N. Patel, electrical engineer, inventor of the carbon dioxide laser; recipient of the 1996 National Medal of Science; vice Chancellor for Research at the University of California, Los Angeles
Kanury Venkata Subba Rao, immunologist, Shanti Swarup Bhatnagar (1997) laureate
Bhaskar Saha, immunologist, Shanti Swarup Bhatnagar (2009) laureate
K. B. Sainis, immunologist, Shanti Swarup Bhatnagar (1994) laureate
Vinod Scaria, bioinformatician, sequenced the first Indian genome
Krityunjai Prasad Sinha, theoretical physicist, Shanti Swarup Bhatnagar (1974) laureate
K. George Thomas, nanotechnologist, Shanti Swarup Bhatnagar (2006) laureate
Mohan R. Wani, cell biologist, N-BIOS laureate

Humanities and social sciences
 Satish Alekar, playwright
 Purushottam Laxman Deshpande, Marathi writer
 Vijay Kelkar, economist, academic and Chairman of the 13th Finance Commission of India
 Nagnath Lalujirao Kottapalle, educationist and Marathi writer; taught at the Marathi department
 Kiran Nagarkar, novelist, recipient of  the 2001 Sahitya Akademi Award
 Sharmila Rege, Indian sociologist and formerly Director of the Women's Studies Centre at the University of Pune
 Ram Shankar Tripathi, Indian Sanskrit scholar and Padma Shri awardee
 Jyoti Gogte, Indian academician

Media and entertainment
 Radhika Apte, model and actress
 Mukta Barve, Marathi actress who starred in National Award-winning movie Jogwa
 Pooja Batra, model and actress
 Shereen Bhan, journalist
 Mini Menon, journalist
 Radhika Chaudhari, actress
 Tanushree Dutta, model and actress
 Mugdha Godse, model and actress
 Prahlad Kakkar, ad film director
 Sonali Kulkarni, actress
 Shaiju Mathew, author and filmmaker
 Anjali Menon, Malayalam film director

Sports

Others
Nabeel Rajab, Bahraini human rights activist
 Shivani Verma (BK Shivani), spiritual speaker

References

Notes

Citations 

Pune University
people